The Environmental Integrity Group (EIG) is a negotiation group consisting of 6 parties to the UNFCCC. When it was formed in 2000, it only consisted of Switzerland, Korea, and Mexico.

History 
The Environmental Integrity Group was initiated by Switzerland during the negotiations of the Kyoto Protocol, where only party groups were allowed to negotiate. Switzerland was not part of any group and they did not want to join the Umbrella Group. So Switzerland declared to form the EIG and invited other independent parties to join.

Joint Submissions 
 2016 on matters of the Global Stock Take (GST)

Members 
 2000  (founding member)
 2000  (founding member)
 2000  (founding member)
 20??  
 20?? 
 2017

Literature and References
Literature
Emily Laur: Who is the Environmental Integrity Group?, In: Digital Lotus: Thursday, March 24, 2016.

'References

United Nations Framework Convention on Climate Change